Prata d'Ansidonia is a comune and town in the province of L'Aquila, in the Abruzzo region of central Italy.

References

See also
Castel Camponeschi
Peltuinum